Maurice Samuel (February 8, 1895 – May 4, 1972) was a Romanian-born British and American novelist, translator and lecturer of Jewish heritage.

Biography 
Born in Măcin, Tulcea County, Romania, to Isaac Samuel and Fanny Acker, Samuel moved to Paris with his family at the age of five and about a year later to England, where he studied at the Victoria University. His parents spoke Yiddish at home and he developed strong attachments to the Jewish people and the Yiddish language at early age. This later became the motivation for many of the books he wrote as an adult. Eventually, Samuel left England and emigrated to the United States, settling in New York City's Lower East Side. He served in the United States Army during World War I.

A Jewish intellectual and writer, Samuel is best known for his book You Gentiles, published in 1924. Most of his work concerns itself with Judaism or the Jew's role in history and modern society, but he also wrote more conventional fiction, such as The Web of Lucifer, which takes place during the Borgias' rule of Renaissance Italy, and the fantasy science-fiction novel The Devil that Failed. Samuel also wrote the nonfiction King Mob under the pseudonym "Frank K. Notch". He and his work received acclaim within the Jewish community during his lifetime, including the 1944 Anisfield-Wolf Book Award for his non-fiction work, The World of Sholom Aleichem. He received the Itzik Manger Prize for Yiddish literature posthumously in 1972.

Samuel died in New York City in 1972 at the age of 77.

Published works

Fiction 
 The Outsider (1921)
 Whatever Gods (1923)
 Beyond Woman (1934)
 Web of Lucifer (1947)
 The Devil that Failed (1952)
 The Second Crucifixion (1960)

Non-fiction 
 You Gentiles (1924)
 I, the Jew (1927)
 What Happened in Palestine: The Events of August, 1929: Their Background and Significance
 King Mob: A Study of the Present-Day Mind (1931)
 On the Rim of the Wilderness: The Conflict in Palestine (1931)
 Jews on Approval (1932)
 The Great Hatred (1940)
 The World of Sholom Aleichem (1943)
 Harvest in the Desert (1944)
 Haggadah of Passover (1947) (translation)
 Prince of the Ghetto (1948)
 The Gentleman and the Jew (1950)
 Level Sunlight (1953)
 The Professor And The Fossil (1956)
 Certain People of the Book (1955)
 Little Did I Know: Recollections and Reflections (1963)
 Blood Accusation: the Strange History of the Beiliss Case (1966)
 Light on Israel (1968)
 In Praise of Yiddish (1971)
 In the Beginning, Love: Dialogues on the Bible (collaboration) (1975)

References

Who's Who In World Jewry, 1972 edition
Louis Kaplan, "On Maurice Samuel's twenty-fifth Yahrzeit - death anniversary of Jewish author", Judaism, Fall 1997
Maurice Samuel Papers , Americanjewisharchives.org.

External links

1895 births
1972 deaths
20th-century American Jews
20th-century American male writers
20th-century American novelists
20th-century British male writers
20th-century British novelists
Alumni of the Victoria University of Manchester
American male novelists
American people of Romanian-Jewish descent
American Zionists
British Jews
Jewish American novelists
People from Măcin
People from New York City
Romanian Jews
Socialist Party of Great Britain members
United States Army personnel of World War I
Yiddish–English translators
Yiddish-language writers
Romanian expatriates in France
Romanian emigrants to the United Kingdom
British emigrants to the United States
Itzik Manger Prize recipients